Óscar Arias Sánchez (born 13 September 1940 in Heredia, Costa Rica) is a Costa Rican activist and Nobel Peace Prize laureate. He was President of Costa Rica from 1986 to 1990 and from 2006 to 2010. He received the Nobel Peace Prize in 1987 for his efforts to end the Central American crisis.
He was also a recipient of the Albert Schweitzer Prize for Humanitarianism and a trustee of Economists for Peace and Security.  In 2003, he was elected to the board of directors of the International Criminal Court's Trust Fund for Victims.

Early life
Arias was born into an upper-class family in the province of Heredia. Arias concluded his secondary schooling at the Saint Francis College in the capital city of San José. He then went to the United States and enrolled in Boston University with the intention of studying medicine, but he soon returned to his home country and completed degrees in law and economics at the University of Costa Rica. In 1967, Arias traveled to the United Kingdom and enrolled in the London School of Economics. He received a doctoral degree in political science from the University of Essex in 1974. Arias has received over fifty honorary degrees, including doctorates from Harvard University, Princeton University, Dartmouth College, Oberlin College, Wake Forest University, Ithaca College and Washington University in St. Louis.

First presidency 

Arias joined the National Liberation Party (PLN), Costa Rica's main social democratic party. In 1986 he ran successfully for president on that party's ticket. Arias's presidency saw the transformation of Costa Rica's economy from one based on the traditional cash crops (coffee and bananas) to one more focused on non-traditional agriculture (e.g., of exotic flowers and fruits) and tourism. Some within the PLN criticized his administration for abandoning the party's social democratic teachings and promoting a neoliberal economic model. He is now often regarded as a neoliberal although he is a member of a nominally social democratic party.

Arias received the 1987 Nobel Peace Prize with the help of John Biehl, his peer in England, and Rodrigo Madrigal Nieto for his work towards the signing of the Esquipulas II Accords. This was a plan intended to promote democracy and peace on the Central American isthmus during a time of great turmoil: leftist guerrillas were fighting against the governments in El Salvador and Guatemala, which were backed by the United States under the auspices of the Cold War; the Contras, supported by the United States, were fighting an insurgency against the Sandinista government in Nicaragua; Honduras, only recently wresting political power from its military, was caught in the middle as a base for U.S. military forces; and on Costa Rica's other border, Panama faced the oppression of Manuel Noriega's military dictatorship. With the support of Arias, the various armed conflicts ended within the decade (Guatemala's civil war finally ended in 1996).

Arias then called for a higher level of integration in the Central America region and promoted the creation of the Central American Parliament (Parlamento Centroamericano). During his current administration, Arias has declared that Costa Rica will not enter the Central American Parliament.  Arias also modified the country's educational system. The most notable action in this respect was the reintroduction of standardized academic tests at the end of primary and secondary school.

Second presidency

The Costa Rican constitution had been amended in 1969 to include a clause forbidding former presidents to seek re-election. Arias challenged this at the Sala IV, the Constitutional Chamber of the Supreme Court of Justice of Costa Rica, which initially rejected his application in September 2000. In 2003, a group of Arias supporters presented an unconstitutionality challenge against the 1969 constitutional amendment forbidding re-election, and this time the ruling in April 2003 struck down the prohibition against non-consecutive re-election. This decision was denounced as a "state blow" or "coup d'état" by ex-president Luis Alberto Monge.

Arias announced in 2004 that he intended to run again for president in the February 2006 general elections.  By then, he was the only living former president who was not either in jail, under indictment or facing an investigation.  Though for years private polling companies and several news media published polls predicting Arias would win by a wide margin, the election was initially deemed too close to call. A month later, on 7 March, after a manual recount, the official results showed Arias beat center-left contender Ottón Solís by 18,169 votes (1.2% of valid votes cast), and finished just a few thousand votes over the 40 percent threshold required to capture the presidency in a single round. He took the oath of office at noon on 8 May 2006 at the National Stadium. In his speech on 15 September 2008, he admitted that he was tired because of the criticism of his opponents.

On 1 June 2007, he switched Costa Rica's diplomatic recognition from the Republic of China (Taiwan) to the People's Republic of China, making Costa Rica the 167th nation in the world to do so. Subsequently, under diplomatic and financial pressure from Beijing, he induced the Dalai Lama, a fellow Nobel Peace Prize laureate, to postpone indefinitely a proposed and much anticipated visit during Beijing's suppression of controversial riots in Tibet.

At the 5th Summit of the Americas in Trinidad and Tobago, on 18 April 2009, Arias gave a speech on the topic "We've been doing something wrong". Directed at fellow Latin American leaders, he decried Latin America's lack of development compared to other parts of the world, calling for pragmatism, and more resources directed at education rather than militaries.

Mediator in 2009 Honduran Constitutional Crisis

In 2009, the Supreme Court of Honduras issued an arrest warrant for Honduran President Manuel Zelaya because of violations of the constitution and laws. Two days later, the National Congress of Honduras (in which Zelaya's own party held 62 out of 128 seats, more than any other party), also voted to dismiss Zelaya.
Zelaya fled to Costa Rica.  The Honduran constitution mandated that the head of Congress, Roberto Micheletti, who was next in the presidential line of succession, becomes the provisional head of state since Vice President Elvin Ernesto Santos had resigned in December 2008 to run for president. Micheletti's term ended 27 January 2010.

Arias began serving as mediator between Zelaya and Micheletti in the 2009 Honduran constitutional crisis. Representatives of the two Hondurans met with Arias on various occasions but so far have failed to reach any kind of agreement.  As described above (with factual citations), Arias himself was initially prohibited by Costa Rica's constitutional court from another term, due to constitutional term limits, but this was reversed using legal means, with the consent of the Costa Rican Sala IV court, unlike in Honduras. New elections in Honduras are planned for 29 November 2009. Micheletti's government stated on 2 July 2009 that it is willing to hold this year's presidential election early. Arias presented a seven-point agreement, which calls for the return of Zelaya as president – a condition deemed unacceptable to the interim government. Zelaya's representatives accepted the Arias proposal "in principle" but Micheletti's representatives balked at the key point of Zelaya returning to power in Honduras.

Health
In August 2007, Arias was affected by tendinitis, and in April 2008 he canceled some activities because of muscular pain in his lumbar region. Subsequently, due to increasing difficulty in speaking over the course of several weeks, Arias went to the Philadelphia Ears, Nose and Throat Associates medical center in the United States on 20 May 2008, where it was determined that he had a nonmalignant cyst on his vocal cords. As a result, it was announced on 21 May that doctors advised him not to speak for one month, saying that if this did not help, surgery would be considered. On 11 August 2009 Arias was diagnosed with H1N1 Influenza, but he recovered.

Controversy
Some of Arias’s actions have generated controversy:
In 2004, in response to a rival candidate (Antonio Álvarez) for his party's nomination challenging him to a debate, Oscar Arias said: "Eagles live in high places, and make a serious mistake if they go down to the mud to fight with snails."
In 2010, during the closing weeks of his second term, he inaugurated various unachieved projects with ribbon-cutting and bronze plaque ceremonies:
The new National Stadium, despite the fact that it was only about 75% finished.
The "new presidential offices" despite the fact that these offices do not exist yet. In fact, the land is still for sale and the Legislative Assembly has allocated no funds yet in order to buy it, let alone build anything on the vacant lot.
The new Juan Santamaría International Airport installation, despite the fact the project was only 82% completed.

Further controversies followed him even after his role as a president had come to an end. The route from Escazú to Caldera built by the Spanish company Autopistas del Sol has undergone heavy criticism over the years for its high tolls and dangerous roads (which had to undergo heavy maintenance to prevent further rock slides). Oscar Arias was also blamed for having invited a Canadian corporation to perform heavy mining which could potentially compromise the local biodiversity. Their permissions were revoked during the Chinchilla Miranda administration which gave the impression of Arias-Chinchilla enmity following his sudden criticism of then president Laura Chinchilla Miranda who was popularly regarded as a successor.

Judicial accusations

In 2017 Costa Rica's General Attorney office indicted Arias for the Crucitas case, a case in which former Environment Minister Roberto Dobles and Arias as president signed a 2008 decree ceding the Canadian company Infinito Gold control over a protected area near the Nicaraguan border known as Crucitas for gold mining and declaring it "national interest", something that the Prosecution argued was illegal as protected areas cannot be granted for exploitation of any kind. Dobles was previously found guilty of the charges, but Arias was not indicted alongside him by the previous General Attorney Jorge Chavarría (often accused of being close to Arias). The new General Attorney Emilia Navas reopened the case indicting Arias.

Also in 2019 psychiatrist and anti-Nuclear activist Alexandra Arce von Herold formally accused Arias of rape at the Public Ministry. Following her allegation three more women came to light accusing Arias of sexual harassment and misconduct. Arias denied the charges. In December 2020, all sexual harassment charges against Arias were dismissed.

References

External links

 Interview in Guernica magazine
  
 Ubben Lecture at DePauw University; 8 December 2010 (includes audio/video)
 English translation of the "Algo hicimos mal" speech
    U.S.: Arias Government Knew How The Constitutional Court Would Vote On The TLC/WikiLeaks On Costa Rica: Translated From La Nación
 Accomplishments of Oscar Arias Sanchez
 Education Center Named After Oscar Arias
Biography by CIDOB (in Spanish)

 

|-

|-

|-

|-

|-

|-

1940 births
Living people
People from Heredia (canton)
Costa Rican people of Spanish descent
National Liberation Party (Costa Rica) politicians
Presidents of Costa Rica
Costa Rican Christian socialists
University of Costa Rica alumni
Alumni of the University of Essex
Alumni of the London School of Economics
Boston University alumni
Costa Rican Nobel laureates
Nobel Peace Prize laureates
Members of the Inter-American Dialogue